Chase Alexander Crawford is an American actor and film producer from Monroe, Ohio. He best known for his roles in independent films such as Goat and In the Radiant City.

Early life
Crawford was born in New Bern, North Carolina to Susan and Ray Crawford. He attended and graduated from Monroe High School and D Russel Lee Career-Technology Center (a Butler Tech school) in 2014. He landed his first commercial role in August 2013 and graduated high school early to focus on his acting career.

Career

2015–2019
After appearing in the 2016 Sundance Film Festival selection Goat alongside James Franco and Nick Jonas, he appeared in 2016 Toronto International Film Festival selection In the Radiant City.

In 2016, he played in various films including Joel Moss Levinson's Boy Band alongside Questlove, Steve Agee, Jerry O'Connell and Gilbert Gottfried, and the film adaption of the Newbery Medal award-winning book Walk Two Moons, which has been renamed The Marriage Bed. 

Crawford produced Life Backstage, a show that offered an inside look of artists such as Waka Flocka Flame, Cheat Codes and Louis the Child. Following the success of Life Backstage, Crawford produced his first feature film, Alan and the Fullness of Time, alongside childhood friend Markus Cook in 2017.

In 2018, Crawford went on to produce Cooper Flannigan's musical comedy Moondance in Kalamazoo, Michigan. He also appeared in a handful of films including Johnny Chechitelli's Worst. Christmas. Ever and Andrew Paul Davis' Palace. 

Crawford launched his podcast, According to the Internet, in June 2018. The podcast debuted at No. 186 in the Apple Podcasts Top 200. The format of the show is described as "pop culture banter" and each episode features a different guest.

In 2019, he served as a producer on the psychological thriller The Clearing, documentary feature The Land Beyond and Zach Daulton's Looking Back. The actor and producer also ventured into directing working on music videos with Cal Scruby and "Rhythm + Flow" alum Caleb Colossus.

2020–present 

In early 2020, Crawford and his company executive produced Joe Chrest's dark comedy The Cran. The film was shot in and around Bowling Green, Ohio. 

March 13, 2020 also marked Crawford's first theatrical release as he saw Moondance release in 18 cities. Due to the coronavirus pandemic, several theatres had to cancel screenings, leading the producer to pen an article for Medium titled "I produced the lowest-earning new release film in the worst box office week in 20 years… A Recap". The article went viral and was a top post on Reddit and several other message boards. 

Crawford rounded out 2020 leading production on Michael Pomeroy's debut comedy The Rest of Your Life and TV documentary A Polo Legacy, which follows Chicago businessman James Drury and the Oak Brook Polo Club. 

In early 2021, it was announced that Crawford's company Four by Three had acquired distribution rights to How We Lookin?, a documentary about the life of Hall of Fame broadcaster Marty Brennaman. The documentary features interviews with Pete Rose, Nick Lachey, Urban Meyer and premiered on American Broadcasting Company.

In December of 2021, Chase Crawford was named to the Forbes Next 1000 list. 

Crawford signed on to Co-Executive Produce Miguel Faus's debut feature Calladita in February 2022.  The project went on to become the first European film funded by NFTs.

Other work

Crawford pursued modeling for a brief period of time, landing a Times Square billboard for H&M in November, 2014. He has also appeared in ad campaigns for Uber, Taco Bell, Acura and Samsung.''

Personal life

Crawford married his high school sweetheart, Alexandra, shortly after the two began taking classes at Miami University. The two eventually transferred and graduated from the University of Cincinnati. The couple lives in Cincinnati and they have three daughters, Cambrie, Carter and Cobi.

References

External links

Living people
Male actors from Cincinnati
Male actors from North Carolina
American male television actors
1996 births
People from New Bern, North Carolina
People from Monroe, Ohio